John Kaminiates (fl. tenth century) was a Greek resident of Thessalonica when the city, then one of the largest in the Byzantine Empire, was besieged and sacked by a Saracen force led by Leo of Tripoli in 904. His account of the city's plunder, On the capture of Thessalonica, (Εις την άλωσιν της Θεσσαλονίκης, Eis tēn alōsin tēs Thessalonikēs) survives in four manuscripts; though of these, none were written before the fourteenth century, causing some concern over the text's authenticity.

Name

John Kaminiates has alternatively been transliterated John Kaminatos, Ioannis Kaminiatis, and sometimes appears in the Latinized forms Ioannis Caminiatae, Joannes Cameniata and John Cameniates.

Notes

References
English
Kaminiates, John The capture of Thessaloniki (D. Frendo, A. Fotiou, and G.Böhlig, trans.) Byzantina Australiensia, 12. Perth: Australian Association for Byzantine Studies, 2000. .
Kazhdan, Alexander Some Questions Addressed to the Scholars, who Believe in the Authenticity of Kaminiates’ Capture of Thessalonika Byzantinische Zeitschrift 71. 1978. p. 301–314. ISSN 0007-7704.
 

Foreign
Kaminiates, John Eis ten alosin tes Thessalonikes / De Expugnatione Thessalonicae (Böhlig, Gertrude, ed.) Corpus Fontium Historiae Byzantinae. Berlin: De Gruyter, 1973.

External links
A portion of the translated text online
The Manuscript Editing Process - An interesting look at how the four surviving manuscripts are used to create a modern scholarly Greek edition.

10th-century Byzantine historians
Byzantine Thessalonian writers
Byzantine people of the Arab–Byzantine wars